Page House may refer to:

Canada
 Enos W. Page House, Lockeport, Nova Scotia, a historic place in Shelburne County, Nova Scotia

United States
 Page House (Caltech), California, a residential house at the California Institute of Technology
 Henry H. Page House, Vermont, Illinois
 William Page House, Glasgow, Kentucky, a National Register of Historic Places listing in Barren County, Kentucky
 Page House (Milton, Kentucky), a National Register of Historic Places listing in Trimble County, Kentucky
 Christopher Page House, Bedford, Massachusetts
 Nathaniel Page House, Bedford, Massachusetts
 Thomas D. Page House, Chicopee, Massachusetts
 H. P. Page House, Newton, Massachusetts
 Henry G. Page House, Fergus Falls, Minnesota, a former National Register of Historic Places listing in Otter Tail County, Minnesota
 Page House (Cohecton, New York)
 Williamson Page House, Morrisville, North Carolina
 Judge C. H. Page House, Astoria, Oregon, a National Register of Historic Places listing in Clatsop County, Oregon
 Paul D. Page House, Bastrop, Texas, a National Register of Historic Places listing in Bastrop County, Texas
 Daniel R. and Sophia G. Page House, Page Ranch, Utah, a National Register of Historic Places listing in Iron County, Utah
 Thomas Nelson Page House, Washington, D.C.

See also
 Page-Bell House, Milton, Kentucky, a National Register of Historic Places listing in Trimble County, Kentucky
 Bigelow-Page House, Skowhegan, Maine
 Havens-Page House, North Omaha, Nebraska
 Sharp-Page House, a National Register of Historic Places listing in Columbus, Ohio
 Abbott-Page House, Milan, Ohio
 Page-Gilbert House, Austin, Texas
 Page-Vawter House, Ansted, West Virginia